Pachira glabra (syn. Bombacopsis glabra) is a tropical wetland tree in the mallow family Malvaceae, native to eastern Brazil, where it grows along rivers and other waterways. It is generally known by the nonscientific names Guinea peanut, French peanut, Saba nut, money tree, and lucky tree. It shares many of these common names with Pachira aquatica, the Malabar chestnut, which is quite similar looking, has similar culinary and ornamental uses, and is often confused with P. glabra.

Description

It has smooth greenish-gray bark and the trunks are often swollen at the base, even at a young age. Its large, white, fragrant flowers bloom on a long, terminal peduncle, opening at night and dropping by the middle of the following day.

Habitat
The tree is highly adaptable to various soils and flourishes in full sun or partial shade. The tree is both drought and flood resistant.

Uses

Culinary use
P. glabra is grown in West and Central Africa as a foodcrop. The seeds are rich in oil and contain 16% protein and 40–50% fat. The seeds taste similar to peanuts and are typically boiled or roasted, with the roasted seeds sometimes ground to make a hot drink. The young leaves and flowers are also eaten.

Ornamental use
Young P. glabra trees can easily be grown in flowerpots and survive a range of conditions as long as they remain above freezing temperatures. They are marketed commercially as ornamentals with several small trees in a single flowerpot, their trunks braided; specimens are similar in appearance to P. aquatica and many small ornamentals sold as P. aquatica are actually P. glabra. However, P. aquatica has woody gray bark, while P. glabra'''s is a smoother greenish-gray, and P. aquatica will only develop a swollen trunk with age. Likewise, the flowers of P. aquatica feature red-tipped petals and red anthers, whereas the flowers of P. glabra are all white. In addition, the P. aquatica blooms last marginally longer during than those of P. glabra. P. glabra seeds are green rather than brown and half the size of those of P. aquatica. Seed yields are also lower than those of P. aquatica.

Notes

References

External links

 Money Tree Plant – Pachira glabra: Distinguishing Pachira glabra and Pachira aquatica''
 Photographs of Pachira glabra and P. aquatica flowers

Bombacoideae
Trees of Brazil
Edible nuts and seeds
House plants
Ornamental trees
African cuisine